Marimastat was a proposed antineoplastic drug developed by British Biotech. It acted as a broad-spectrum matrix metalloproteinase inhibitor.

Marimastat performed poorly in clinical trials, and development was terminated. This may be, however, a result of targeting cancer at too late of a stage. This is supported by the fact that MMP inhibitors have more recently been shown in animal models to be more effective in earlier stages of cancers. (Effects of angiogenesis inhibitors on multistage carcinogenesis in mice. Science 284, 808-812. Bergers, G., Javaherian, K., Lo, K.-M., Folkman, J., and Hanahan, D. (1999)).

See also 
 Batimastat

References 

Experimental cancer drugs
Hydroxamic acids
Matrix metalloproteinase inhibitors